Abdelmajid Dolmy (was a Moroccan footballer who played as a midfielder. He was nicknamed "Maestro".

Career

Dolmy played club football for Raja Casablanca in the Botola. He also played for the Morocco national football team at the 1984 Summer Olympics, and in the 1986 FIFA World Cup finals.

In 2006, Dolmy was selected by the Confederation of African Football (CAF) as one of the best 200 African football players of the last 50 years.

Style of play and legacy
Abdelmajid Dolmy was a midfielder. Despite his small physical appearance, he possessed the highest level of technical ability, as well as a surprising ability to manage and direct the game. He was also known for his ability to retrieve the ball and dribble more than one player at a time. For this reason, his fans nicknamed him the "Maestro" who, despite all the fame he had achieved, remained so modest and shy that he did not do any interviews throughout his career.

Death
The cause of his sudden death is still unclear, but according to media reports, Dolmy succumbed to a heart attack.
 
The news of his death spread quickly on social media with several thousands of Moroccans sharing it on their walls and expressing their sorrow for the death of one of the most cherished football players in the history of Morocco

Honors
Raja Casablanca
Coupe du Trône: 1974, 1977, 1982

Morocco
1976 African Cup of Nations

Individual 
 IFFHS All-time Morocco Men's Dream Team

References

External links
 
 

1953 births
2017 deaths
Moroccan footballers
Footballers from Casablanca
Morocco international footballers
1986 FIFA World Cup players
Footballers at the 1984 Summer Olympics
Olympic footballers of Morocco
1976 African Cup of Nations players
1978 African Cup of Nations players
1986 African Cup of Nations players
1988 African Cup of Nations players
Competitors at the 1979 Mediterranean Games
Africa Cup of Nations-winning players
Raja CA players
Botola players
Association football midfielders
Mediterranean Games competitors for Morocco